Manuel Cristian Rodríguez (born 27 June 1973 in San Isidro, Buenos Aires) is a retired professional boxer from Argentina. As an amateur, Rodríguez represented his native country in the featherweight division (57 kg), winning a bronze medal at the 1995 Pan American Games in Mar del Plata, Argentina. Rated as a lightweight he made his professional debut in August 1996, defeating compatriot Roberto Rivademar. He quit after eight pro bouts (6 wins, 1 loss and 1 draw).

References 
 

1973 births
Living people
Lightweight boxers
People from San Isidro, Buenos Aires
Boxers from Buenos Aires
Boxers at the 1995 Pan American Games
Pan American Games bronze medalists for Argentina
Argentine male boxers
Pan American Games medalists in boxing
Medalists at the 1995 Pan American Games